Mountain View is a town in Kiowa County, Oklahoma, United States. The population was 795 at the 2010 census, a decline of 9.7 percent from 880 in 2000.

History
The Chicago, Rock Island and Pacific Railroad (Rock Island) extended a line from Chickasha to the northern part of the Kiowa, Comanche and Apache Reservation in 1899. It terminated about two miles from an existing tent city called Oakdale, consisting of a store and post office on the former Cheyenne and Arapaho Reservation. The Oakdale post office was renamed Mountain View, honoring the nearby Wichita Mountains, on October 9, 1900.

In 1903, the entire town relocated to a site closer to the railroad. The move was completed in 1904. Nicknaming itself, "the City in the Woods," the town became a point for transshipping Texas cattle on the Rock Island. Cattle were unloaded from trains and allowed to graze on Kiowa, Comanche and Apache Reservation land before resuming their journey to markets. By 1910, the town had a population of 855.

Jacob Aldolphus Bryce (Delf A. 'Jelly' Bryce), born 1906 at Mountain View, was an FBI agent significant for being an exceptional marksman and fast draw, and for his dress sense.

Geography
Mountain View is located at  (35.100293, -98.749601).

According to the United States Census Bureau, the town has a total area of 0.5 square mile (1.3 km2), all land.

Demographics

As of the census of 2010, there were 795 people, 381 households, and 243 families residing in the town. There were 452 housing units at an average density of 911.9 per square mile (349.0/km2). The racial makeup of the town was 85.68% White, 0.34% African American, 10.57% Native American, 0.23% Asian, 0.45% from other races, and 2.73% from two or more races. Hispanic or Latino of any race were 2.50% of the population.

There were 381 households, out of which 25.7% had children under the age of 18 living with them, 51.2% were married couples living together, 10.5% had a female householder with no husband present, and 36.2% were non-families. 34.4% of all households were made up of individuals, and 19.9% had someone living alone who was 65 years of age or older. The average household size was 2.25 and the average family size was 2.88.

In the town, the population was spread out, with 22.8% under the age of 18, 6.8% from 18 to 24, 22.4% from 25 to 44, 23.5% from 45 to 64, and 24.4% who were 65 years of age or older. The median age was 44 years. For every 100 females, there were 77.1 males. For every 100 females age 18 and over, there were 71.9 males.

The median income for a household in the town was $21,583, and the median income for a family was $33,333. Males had a median income of $23,250 versus $19,375 for females. The per capita income for the town was $16,677. About 19.1% of families and 20.3% of the population were below the poverty line, including 14.8% of those under age 18 and 26.9% of those age 65 or over.

References

Towns in Kiowa County, Oklahoma
Towns in Oklahoma